Gonystylus borneensis grows as a tree up to  tall, with a trunk diameter of up to . Bark is greyish brown. Habitat is forest from sea-level to  altitude. G. borneensis is endemic to Borneo.

References

borneensis
Endemic flora of Borneo
Trees of Borneo
Plants described in 1893